The Danish Men's Handball cup is the nationwide cup tournament for men's handball teams in Denmark. It’s also known as Santander Cup for sponsorship reasons. The competition has been played annually since 1964.

Tournament structure 
The initial 6 rounds are managed by the three regional federations with the DHF taking over the tournament at the round of 16. It ultimately results in a final four event scheduled between Christmas and New Year. The winner of the tournament qualify for the annual Super Cup held during the summer where they meet the season's league winner. If the same team wins both the league and the cup, the losing cup finalist will participate as the second team in the Super Cup. The winner also qualifies for the EHF European League

Past winners

Finals

Most valuable players 
Since 1993, DHF has named an MVP (Danish: pokalfighter) following the cup final.

External links 
 The Danish Handball Federation 
 About the tournament

References

Handball competitions in Denmark
Recurring sporting events established in 1964
Annual sporting events in Denmark
1964 establishments in Denmark